John J. Furrow Sr. (August 18, 1929 – March 16, 2018) was an American football player and coach. He served as the head football coach at West Chester University of West Chester, Pennsylvania from 1972 to 1978.

References

External links
 West Chester Hall of Fame profile

1929 births
2018 deaths
West Chester Golden Rams football coaches
West Chester Golden Rams football players
Sportspeople from Philadelphia
Players of American football from Philadelphia